Four ships of the Danish Royal Navy have borne the name HDMS Niels Juel:
  (1856–1879), a 42-gun steam frigate
  (1923−1943), a coastal defense ship scuttled by her crew after a Luftwaffe attack in 1943. The vessel was later refloated as Nordland
  (1980−2009), a multi-purpose corvette from the Cold War and of the eponymous 
  (2010–present), a frigate and third member of the current  in service with the Danish Royal Navy

References

See also
 Niels Juel
 Niels Juel-class corvette (launched late 1970s) of the Danish Navy
 Juel (disambiguation)

Royal Danish Navy ship names